Toxophleps is a genus of moths of the family Noctuidae erected by George Hampson in 1893. The species are transferred in to Tarache. The Global Lepidoptera Names Index and Lepidoptera and Some Other Life Forms describe this genus as a synonym of Cophanta.

Description
Palpi upturned, where the second joint reaching vertex of head and roughly scaled and third joint short. Antennae minutely ciliated in male. Thorax smoothly scaled. Abdomen with dorsal tufts on proximal segments. Tibia naked. Forewings with nearly rectangular apex. Veins 7 to 9 stalked. Hindwings with veins 6 and 7 stalked.

References

Acontiinae